Montúfar Canton is a canton of Ecuador, located in Carchi Province.  Its capital is the city of San Gabriel.  The canton's population in the 2001 census was 28,576 and was 30,511 in the 2010 census.

Montúfar is located in the Andes of northern Ecuador.

The canton is subdivided into the parishes of Chitán de Navarrete, Cristóbal Colón, Fernández Salvador, La Paz, Piartal, and San Gabriel.

Demographics
Ethnic groups as of the Ecuadorian census of 2010:
Mestizo  93.5%
White  2.5%
Afro-Ecuadorian  2.2%
Indigenous  1.2%
Montubio  0.3%
Other  0.2%

References

Cantons of Carchi Province